Chandi is a given name and surname. Notable people with the name include:

Given name
 Chandi Jones, American basketball player
 Chandi Prasad Bhatt, Indian environmentalist
 Chandi Lahiri (1931–2018), Indian journalist 
 Chandi Prasad Mohanty, Indian army officer
 Chandi Moore, American health specialist and activist
 Chandi Wickramasinghe (born 1983), Sri Lankan cricketer

Surname
 Gurwinder Singh Chandi, Indian field hockey player
 Preet Chandi (born 1988/1989), British Army medical officer